Liberty Baptist Church is a historic church built about 1858 in Grooverville, Georgia. It was added to the National Register of Historic Places on August 20, 2013. It is located on Liberty Church Road. There is a Georgia Historical Commission historical marker at the site. According to the marker: "In 1841 the Ocklochnee anti-Missionary Baptist Association passed a ruling to dismiss members believing in the 'new fangled institutions of the day.'" One of the excommunicated sisters joined with others in forming the Liberty Baptist Church. The church includes a slave gallery. Freed slaves from the area formed First Elizabeth Church in Grooverville.

See also
National Register of Historic Places listings in Brooks County, Georgia
Grooverville Methodist Church

References

External links
 Liberty Baptist Church historical marker

Baptist churches in Georgia (U.S. state)
Churches on the National Register of Historic Places in Georgia (U.S. state)
Buildings and structures in Brooks County, Georgia
National Register of Historic Places in Brooks County, Georgia